The gorilla is a species of great ape.

Gorilla, Gorillas, etc., may also refer to:

Film
 The Gorilla (1927 film), a silent film based on the play
 The Gorilla (1930 film), a sound remake of the 1927 film
 The Gorilla (1939 film), a remake starring the Ritz Brothers
 The Gorillas (film), a 1964 French comedy film
 Gorilla (film), a 2019 Tamil heist comedy thriller film

Literature
 The Gorilla (play), a 1925 American play by Ralph Spence
 Gorilla, a 1983 book by Anthony Browne

Music
 The Gorillas, also known as The Hammersmith Gorillas, a 1970s UK rock group
 Gorillaz, a British music band created by Damon Albarn and Jamie Hewlett, which was originally named "Gorilla"

Albums
 Gorilla (Bonzo Dog Doo-Dah Band album), 1967
 Gorilla (James Taylor album), 1975
 Gorilla (EP), by Pentagon, 2017
 Gorillaz (album), by Gorillaz, 2001

Songs
 "Gorilla" (song), a 2013 song by Bruno Mars
 "Gorilla", a 1969 song by Warren Zevon from [[Wanted Dead or Alive (Warren Zevon album)|Wanted Dead or Alive]] "If You Could See Her (The Gorilla Song)", a song from the musical Cabaret "Gorilla", a 1987 song by Doctor and the Medics from I Keep Thinking It's Tuesday "The Gorilla Song", a 1994 song by Raffi from BananaphoneOther uses
 Gorilla (advertisement), a 2007 advertisement for Cadbury Dairy Milk in the United Kingdom
 Gorillas (video game), a 1991 computer game
 Gorillas (company), an on-demand grocery delivery company
 Josiah Judah or the Gorilla, American super middleweight boxer
 Gorilla, a BBC Two station ident from 1997 until 2001
 A nickname for Richard S. Fuld Jr.
 The mascot of the Phoenix Suns
 Gene Ontology enRIchment anaLysis and visuaLizAtion tool (GOrilla) a web based gen ontology analytics tool

People with the name
 Gorilla Zoe, American rapper

See also
 800-pound gorilla
 Garrison's Gorillas, a 1967 American TV series
 Gorilla Glass, a brand of specialized toughened glass
 Gorilla Glue, a glue product
 Gorilla suit, a full bodied costume
 Gorilla Warfare (disambiguation)
 Gorillas in popular culture
 Guerrilla (disambiguation)
 Magilla Gorilla, the main character of The Magilla Gorilla Show The Magilla Gorilla Show'', an animated television series